Rüdiger Pipkorn (19 November 1909 – 25 April 1945) was an Oberst (Colonel), and a temporary Standartenführer (Colonel) in the Waffen-SS during World War II. He was killed in action in 1945, while in command of the 35th SS Police Grenadier Division.

In the spring of 1945, he was given command of the 35th SS Police Grenadier Division, which by April was in positions on the Neisse River near Guben, southeast of Berlin. The Soviet Berlin offensive had started on 16 April. He was killed on 25 April 1945 while attempting to break out of the Halbe pocket.

References

Further reading

 
 

1909 births
1945 deaths
SS-Standartenführer
Recipients of the Gold German Cross
Waffen-SS personnel killed in action